Morna Jessie Godwin Nielsen (born 24 February 1990) is a New Zealand former cricketer who played as a slow left-arm orthodox bowler. She appeared in 52 One Day Internationals and 44 Twenty20 Internationals for New Zealand between 2010 and 2016. On 10 November 2015, she got her first five-wicket haul at the Bert Sutcliffe Oval. She played domestic cricket for Northern Districts and Otago, as well as having stints with Durham, Melbourne Stars and Southern Vipers. In August 2018, she announced her retirement from all forms of cricket.

References

External links

1990 births
Living people
Sportspeople from Tauranga
New Zealand expatriate sportspeople in England
New Zealand expatriate sportspeople in Australia
New Zealand women cricketers
New Zealand women One Day International cricketers
New Zealand women Twenty20 International cricketers
Northern Districts women cricketers
Otago Sparks cricketers
Durham women cricketers
Melbourne Stars (WBBL) cricketers
Southern Vipers cricketers